Facing the Truth is a 2002 Danish drama written and directed by Nils Malmros. Shot in black-and-white documentary style, and based on the real life of Malmros' father, the film relates the hardships of a young neurosurgeon struggling through a medical lawsuit. Malmros, whose films are known for their realism, is educated as a surgeon and performed all the film's brain surgery scenes. The film was nominated for the 2003 Bodil Award for Best Danish Film and won the 2003 Danish Film Academy's Robert Award for Film of the Year.

Synopsis
The film opens in 1944, as a young fisherman who has suffered a stroke due to aneurysm is being attended to by a neurosurgeon, Dr. Richard Malmros (Jens Albinus). Malmros operates on the fisherman after injecting him with Thorotrast, a radioactive contrast medium, and the operation is a success. However, 42 years later, the patient develops liver cancer and dies. His widow sues the hospital claiming that the Thorotrast caused the liver cancer. The story flashes back through the life of Richard Malmros. As a child he lived in poverty. His father is unemployed due to World War I. His childhood and later life are greatly influenced by his aunt who is a devout Christian and always warns about the danger of sin. The story continues through his schoolboy days, his university education, and his marriage, which he feels tricked into. The film focuses on the ambiguity of the 'truth' reported in the media as well as the personal dilemma that Richard Malmros faced: his knowledge of the dangers of Thorotrast, and the decision he had to make when there were no alternatives. He could use the Thorotrast, or risk having them die right there, and this was a decision he had to make. The old Richard acknowledges that if he had known what he knows today, clearly some patients should not have been given Thorotrast. Although he is vindicated in court, he remains haunted by feelings of guilt, which he carries from the strong influence of his aunt in his childhood.

Cast

Awards
Facing the Truth won the Best Film at the 2003 Robert Awards.  At the 2003 Mar del Plata Film Festival the film won Best Film and Nils Malmros received a Special Mention for "courage in portraying the ambiguity of truth." At the 2003 Bodil Awards the film was nominated for Best Danish Film and Jens Albinus won the Bodil for Best Actor.

References

Further reading

External links
At kende sandheden at IMDb
At kende sandheden at Det Danske Filminstitut (in Danish)

2002 films
Films directed by Nils Malmros
2002 drama films
Danish drama films
2000s Danish-language films